John Laird (14 June 1805 – 29 October 1874) was a British shipbuilder and key figure in the development of the town of Birkenhead.  He was the elder brother of Macgregor Laird. He was one of the first to use iron in the construction of ships.

Early years
Born in Greenock, Scotland, the eldest son of Scottish entrepreneur William Laird and Agnes (née Macgregor), John Laird was raised in Liverpool and educated at that city's Royal Institution.

In 1824 the Laird family moved to Birkenhead, on the opposite bank of the River Mersey, where William Laird and Daniel Horton established the Birkenhead Iron Works. This manufactured boilers near Wallasey Pool. This partnership was dissolved in 1828 and William Laird was joined in his business by John Laird, who had been a solicitor's articled clerk.  The company was renamed William Laird & Son.

Shipbuilding

Laird realised that the techniques of bending iron plates and riveting them together to build ships were similar to the principles involved in making boilers. Laird's first vessel was a 60 ft pre-fabricated iron lighter in 1829 – displacement sixty tons – which was used on canals and lakes in Ireland. This was followed by further orders for more lighters and in 1833 the paddle steamer Lady Lansdowne was built for the same firm.

Many of the orders were for pre-fabricated river steamers. In 1834, he built the paddle steamer John Randolph for Savannah, Georgia, stated to be the first iron ship seen in America. For the East India Company, he built in 1839 the Nemesis, the first iron vessel carrying guns.

In 1839 Lairds built their first screw-propelled steamer, Robert F. Stockton, a 63 ft tug for use on North American waterways. By 1840, Lairds had built another 21 iron paddle-steamers including four gun boats for anti-piracy patrols for the British East India Company. Further orders for paddle frigates included the 1,400 ton HMS Birkenhead (which he designed) of 1848 which was famously wrecked off South Africa with the loss of over 400 soldiers in 1852.  Perhaps their most famous vessel was the Confederate raider CSS Alabama. In 1857 the business moved to a new yard upstream from the Woodside Ferry, where it remained.

In 1844 John Laird started the construction of the Birkenhead Docks in the tidal Wallasey Pool. These were intended to compete with the Port of Liverpool but the venture was not a success and the system was merged with Liverpool docks in 1858. In October 1863, Laird and his shipbuilding company were caught making two naval ram vessels for the Confederate States Navy: El Toussoun and El Monastir.

The Royal Navy additionally deployed a gunship, HMS Heron, to the area to prevent the half constructed ships from leaving the port.  Laird then sued the British government for impeding on his construction because their construction did not violate the 1819 Foreign Enlistment Act nor British neutrality. In fact, the Lincoln Administration had requested Laird to build armed iron clads for the Union in 1861.

Personal life

In 1829 Laird married Elizabeth Hurry.  In 1860, John Laird was joined in partnership by his three sons, William, John and Henry.  However, John Laird retired in 1861 and the business was taken over by his sons.  It merged with Charles Cammell & Co to form Cammell Laird in 1903.

He was the first mayor of Birkenhead and as chairman of the Birkenhead Improvement Commission, he played a key role in the development of the town.  He was one of the first Commissioners in 1833, which were appointed to erect a market, to light and clean the streets and to maintain a police force. When Birkenhead became a Parliamentary Borough in 1861, John Laird retired from shipbuilding to become its first Member of Parliament for Birkenhead.  He served from 1861 to 1874 as a Conservative. He was also Deputy Lieutenant of Cheshire and Justice of the Peace.

He contributed a great deal to the continuous improvement of the town as a benefactor. Laird was responsible for the building of the Dock Cottages. He made some generous donations for the erection of Saint James Church, the Borough Hospital and the Laird School of Art.

Death/legacy

He died at his home, 63 Hamilton Square, Birkenhead, following a riding accident.  He is buried in the grounds of Birkenhead Priory, next to his yard.

An appeal for donations for a statue of John Laird quickly raised more than required from nearly 2,400 donors. The statue was sculpted by Albert Bruce-Joy. Over 2,000 people walked in procession for the statue's unveiling in 1877. It was unveiled by his friend, Lord Tollemache. The statue now stands in Hamilton Square in the centre of Birkenhead, though it was moved from its original position to make way for a cenotaph.

References

Sources

External links 
 
 
 Wirral Archives Service

1805 births
1874 deaths
Birkenhead
Conservative Party (UK) MPs for English constituencies
English justices of the peace
British naval architects
Scottish politicians
Scottish shipbuilders
UK MPs 1859–1865
UK MPs 1865–1868
UK MPs 1868–1874
UK MPs 1874–1880
Businesspeople from Wirral
People from Greenock
Engineers from Merseyside
19th-century Scottish businesspeople
19th-century English businesspeople